Andrew Lambrou Charalambous (born 1967) is a British businessman. He is currently the Work and Pensions Spokesman for the United Kingdom Independence Party (UKIP).

Life 
His Greek Cypriot father served as a soldier for the British in World War II and later settled in the United Kingdom.
Andrew Charalambous went to William Forster School in Tottenham.

In October 2014, The Times newspaper reported that Charalambous falsely claimed to hold a "PhD in the parallels between Plato’s Utopia and Spartan Society" on his Facebook page as well as claiming to be a "professor of environmental sciences" on his official website. It was also reported that shortly after the revelations, claims that Charalambous was a qualified Barrister-at-Law were removed from his official website. In response, Charalambous made a statement via his official website, refuting claims made in The Times''' article and displaying his academic certificates. These included a Doctorate of Business Administration certificate from the University of Northern Virginia, which lost accreditation after Charalambous had completed his studies there.

 Career 
He was appointed Work and Pensions Spokesman for UKIP in 2016. Leader Paul Nuttall said "By promoting Andrew Charalambous to the role of Work and Pensions I am happy to bring forward someone with the keen intelligence and application that the role requires.

"His track record in his previous brief, Housing shows how he can not only get under the skin of the brief, but he can also take expert opinion in the field with him. Time and again his policies have been co-opted by other parties, we expect no less going forward".

As UKIP Work and Pensions Spokesman, he has called for action to end the north–south divide, and for government to extend its employment drive to parts of the UK which have never recovered the loss of their manufacturing base.

Charalambous made a career in business as a property developer and private landlord. The Daily Telegraph newspaper poked fun at him for falling out with his bank for allegedly taking homeless people off the streets of Covent Garden in London and putting them in his properties. It was also pointed out in the Sunday Mirror that housing in his property portfolio had been rented out to immigrant tenants, despite the fact that UKIP leader Nigel Farage was calling for greater controls on immigration. Following Freedom of Information requests in 2015, Charalambous was shown to be among the biggest landlord recipients of housing benefit, having received £826,395 in the last tax year.

 Political activities 
In the 1992 general election, Charalambous stood for the Conservatives in Tottenham as the youngest candidate of any main party in the General Election. Charalambous had been a member of and financial donor to the Conservative Party and was a founder of Conservative Friends of Cyprus and the Conservative Climate Campaign. He stood twice for the Conservative Party as a parliamentary candidate in local elections and twice in general elections; his most recent attempt was in Edmonton in 2010, where he came second.

In early 2011, Charalambous switched from the Conservative Party to UKIP on the basis that the Conservative coalition government had failed to deliver on the UK-EU referendum, had not taken a sufficiently strong stand on immigration, and was cutting healthcare services. He is currently UKIP's housing spokesperson. In 2011, he represented UKIP in the Feltham and Heston by-election, where he came fourth. In the 2015 general election, he stood for UKIP in North East Cambridgeshire and came second, gaining 22.5% of the vote and beating both Labour and the Liberal Democrats.

In the 2015 post election challenge to Nigel Farage's leadership of the party, Charalambous emerged as a Farage loyalist.Andrew Charalambous tweet 16 May 2015

Charalambous was UKIP's first ever Housing and Environment Spokesman. He is now currently their Work and Pensions Spokesman.

 Environmental efforts 
Also known as 'Dr Earth', Charalambous opened a nightclub in 2008 called Surya, styled as the 'world's first ever ecological club'. One of the main features was a piezoelectric dance floor that attempted to harness energy through human movement. The Economist'' noted that despite Surya's claims, a Dutch company "unveiled plans for a disco with a piezoelectric dancefloor, waterless urinals and bio-beer back in 2006". Charalambous also launched Club4Climate, an 'eco-night' initiative designed to get young people involved in tackling environmental issues. Club4Climate was criticised by Friends of the Earth over an event it promoted in Ibiza; Friends of the Earth stated: "Telling people they can save the world by flying to an island to party is a green con. Club4Climate is misleading people by using our logo and our name..." Charalambous responded: "Our philosophy is about millions of people making a small change to their lifestyles. You aren't going to save the planet by telling them to ride bikes..."

References 

Living people
Environmental bloggers
UK Independence Party parliamentary candidates
Conservative Party (UK) parliamentary candidates
British people of Greek Cypriot descent
British real estate businesspeople
1967 births